UEFA stadium categories are categories for football stadiums laid out in UEFA's  Stadium Infrastructure Regulations. Using these regulations, stadiums are rated as category one, two, three, or four (renamed from elite) in ascending ranking order. These categories replaced the previous method of ranking stadiums on one to five star scale in 2006. 

A stadium must be rated as category four in order to host games in the playoffs of the qualifying stage for the UEFA Champions League, or any game in the main competition. Category four is also required to host any game in the main competition of the UEFA Europa League, UEFA Europa Conference League, UEFA Nations League or the UEFA European Championship final tournament. UEFA does not publish lists of stadiums fulfilling the criteria for any of the categories defined in the UEFA Stadium Infrastructure Regulations.

General
If a retractable roof is present, its use will be directed by consultation between the UEFA delegate and the main assigned referee.

Although the minimum stadium capacity for category four is 8,000, it is required to host the UEFA Europa Conference League final, and only one stadium with a capacity less than 60,000 has been selected to host a UEFA Champions League and the UEFA Euro finals and 30,000 for the UEFA Europa League and the UEFA Nations League finals, since these regulations were introduced in 2006.

After the 2007 UEFA Champions League Final, UEFA President Michel Platini stated that he wanted European Cup finals to be held at stadiums with an average capacity of 70,000 to solve security issues. The hosts for the finals between 2008 and 2013 (Luzhniki Stadium, Stadio Olimpico, Santiago Bernabéu, Wembley Stadium and Allianz Arena) all had capacities of at least 70,000, but the 2014 and 2020 host (Estádio da Luz) held 65,000 spectators, the 2019 host (Metropolitano Stadium) held 67,000 spectators, the 2021 host (Estádio do Dragão) held just 50,033, with the 2022 host (Stade de France) holding 75,000 spectactors.

Differences between categories

See also
 List of European stadiums by capacity

References

External links
UEF6A Stadium Infrastructure Regulations - Edition 2010

Stadia List
Association football venues